Aquilo are an English musical duo from Silverdale, Lancashire, consisting of Tom Higham and Ben Fletcher. They began gaining recognition in 2013 for their singles such as "Calling Me" and "You There", in addition to their five EPs.

The duo's debut album, Silhouettes, was released on 27 January 2017. Their second studio album, ii, was released on 4 May 2018, and the third studio album A Safe Place To Be was released on 15 October 2021.

History

Career beginnings 
Members Tom Higham and Ben Fletcher grew up as neighbours in Silverdale, Lancashire. They were both part of rivaling rock bands in their hometown. Higham studied music production in university. The two worked on their musical projects individually before collaborating as Aquilo.

2013–present: Aquilo, Human, and Calling Me 

Aquilo began receiving attention in 2013 for their debut tracks "You There" and "Calling Me". "You There" was included in BBC Radio 1's playlist on 12 June 2014 and the "Best Of BBC Introducing Stage" choices. The song was also featured in the trailer for the 2014 independent drama Camp X-Ray. Additionally, they performed "Calling Me" and "You There" on the BBC Introducing stage at the 2014 Glastonbury Festival 2014 on 28 June 2014. They also played at the 2014 Kendal Calling festival. Their first EP, Aquilo, was released on 3 March 2014.

On 8 December 2014, they released their second EP, Human.

On 5 March 2015, their collaboration with popular disc jockey Vanic, "Losing You", was released onto YouTube and SoundCloud. It has so far accumulated over 7.5 million 'plays' on SoundCloud as of 10 April 2017. They also collaborated with French DJ and record producer Madeon on "Innocence" from his debut album, Adventure, on 27 March. Besides collaborations, their third EP, Calling Me, was released at the start of June that year. Another EP, Painting Picture Of A War, was later released on 4 December.

On 17 March 2016, they played alongside alt-pop duo Oh Wonder, at O2 Forum Kentish Town, London.

In November 2016, the band appeared on Enigma's eighth studio album The Fall of a Rebel Angel. They provided vocals to the album's closing track and second single, respectively, "Amen".

On 27 January 2017, the duo released their debut album, Silhouettes. Their second studio album, ii, was released on 4 May 2018.

Musical style 
Aquilo's music have been described mainly as alternative, as well as electronica, dream pop, ambient and indie. They are known for producing "soft, calm electro-pop", "chilled electronic", "ravishingly refined sort of dreamily sad electronica", and "fragile dream pop laced with subtle electronica and soulful vocals."

Discography

Albums

EPs

Singles
 "You There" (2014)
 "I Gave It All" (2014)
 "Losing You" (2014)
 "Calling Me" (2015)
 "Good Girl" (2015)
 "Sorry" (2016)
 "So Close to Magic" (2016)
 "Amen" (2016)
 "You Won't Know Where You Stand" (2017)
 "Silhouette" (2017)
 "Almost Over" (2017)
 "I Could Fight on a Wall" (2017)
 "Thin" (2017)
 "Who Are You" (2017)
 "Silent Movies" (2018)
 "Seagull" (2018)
 "Sober" (2020)
 "Just Asking" (2020)
 "Always Forever" (2020)
 "Moving On" (2020)
 "Missing the Mark" (2020)
 "Out in LA" (2021)
 "Our Bones Turn To Stone" (2021)
 "I Wanna See You Smile" (2021)

References

External links
 

Musical groups from Lancashire
Year of establishment missing
English electronic music duos
Dream pop musical groups
Male musical duos
Island Records artists
British ambient music groups